Pacific View Memorial Park is a cemetery located in the Corona del Mar neighborhood of Newport Beach, in Orange County, California. It first opened in 1958, and is known as the final resting place of Academy Award winning actor John Wayne and basketball player Kobe Bryant and his daughter  Gianna Maria-Onore Bryant.

Notable interments
 William Austin (1884–1975), actor
 Les Baxter (1922–1996), musician and composer
 Bijan (1940–2011), fashion designer
 Erica Blasberg (1984–2010), LPGA golfer
 Kobe Bryant (1978–2020), basketball player
 Edmund Burns (1892–1980), actor
 Jeanne Cagney (1919–1984), actress
 William Cagney (1905–1988), actor
 Jeanne Carmen (1930–2007), actress and model
 Jan Crouch (1938–2016), television evangelist 
 Paul Crouch (1934–2013), television evangelist 
 Tony Curcillo (1931-2020), professional football player, NFL, CFL.
 Dorothy Dare (1911–1981), actress
 Kevin DuBrow (1955–2007), singer
 Don Durant (1932–2005), actor and singer
 Margaret Early (1919–2000), actress
 John Eldredge (1904–1961), actor
 Jack Faulkner (1926–2008), football coach
 Dave Freeman (1934–2013), author
 John Gallaudet (1903–1983), actor
 John Gordy (1935–2009), football player
 Mitch Halpern (1967–2000), boxing referee
 Jeff Hanneman (1964–2013), musician
 Bobby Hatfield (1940–2003), singer
 Rudolf Ising (1903–1992), animator
 Rafer Johnson (1934–2020), Olympic decathlete and actor
 Dick Lane (1899–1982), actor and sportscaster
 Rose Lok (1912–1978), pilot
 Marion Mack (1902–1989), actress and screenwriter
 Ray Malavasi (1930–1987), football coach
 Paul Mantz (1903–1964), pilot
 Freddy Martin (1906–1983), bandleader and saxophonist
 Barbara McLean (1903–1996), film editor
 Lee Patrick (1901–1982), actress
 Gene Polito (1918–2010), cinematographer
 Mary Lee Robb (1926–2006), actress
 James Roosevelt (1907–1991), politician
 Roy Rowland (1910—1995), film director
 Paul Salata (1926–2021), football player
 Ruben Salazar (1928–1970), journalist and civil rights activist
 Rich Saul (1948–2012), football player
 Ralph C. Smedley (1878–1965), toastmaster
 Bryan Stephens (1920–1991), baseball player
 June Storey (1918–1991), actress
 Frank Tallman (1919–1978), pilot
 Kam Tong (1906–1969), actor
 John Wayne (1907–1979), actor
 Robert D. Webb (1903–1990), film director
 Niles Welch (1888–1976), actor
 Bob Wian (1914–1992), businessman
 George Yardley (1928–2004), basketball player
 Lila Zali (1918–2003), dancer

References

External links
 
 

1958 establishments in California
Buildings and structures in Newport Beach, California
Cemeteries in Orange County, California